The Law School at the College of New Jersey (now Princeton University) was a department of Princeton University from 1847 until 1852.  It began instruction in 1847 as a modest effort consisting of three professors: Joseph Coerten Hornblower, Richard Stockton Field, and James S. Green. Only seven students obtained a law degree before the school closed in 1852. The short-lived experiment was the furthest the university got in a recurring ambition, marked by varying levels of effort, to establish a law school.  Previously, in the 1820s, an attempt was made to organize teaching in law, but this plan ended following the death of the designated professor.

In 1935, the university once again formed appreciable plans for the start of a law school but was unable to secure a faculty. The desire remained after these unsuccessful efforts but aspirations were relegated to thirsting words rather than material preparations. In 1974, then president of Princeton, William G. Bowen, selected a committee to investigate and advise on the achievability of a law school. The committee recommended plans for a law school be deferred after citing high construction costs. Princeton, Brown, and Dartmouth are the only Ivy League schools to lack a law school, and all Princeton graduates who are lawyers will have received their legal training elsewhere.

Mistaken and fictional references
Since Princeton is a large university, many people and even lawyers may be surprised to learn that it does not have a law school. Indeed, James Madison, the Father of the Constitution, was a Princeton University graduate and a lawyer; however, Madison attended Princeton before the university's short-lived attempt at a law school, during a time when law schools in North America were rare and most lawyers earned their credentials through a period of apprenticeship.

At a press conference of law school deans in 1998 decrying the annual US News Law School Rankings, then New York University School of Law Dean John Sexton quipped, "If they were asked about Princeton Law School, it would appear on the top 20 -- but it doesn't exist"  (Sexton was denouncing the US News usage of reputation survey results from judges, lawyers and law school deans in its ranking formula, expressing doubt over the expertise of some surveyed). A 2003 National Review Online commentary blundered when the author, Candace de Russy, identified the law school at Princeton as real: "These yearnings are embodied in a doctrine called ‘transnational progressivism,’ which is gaining prominence in law schools, for example, at Princeton and Rutgers".

During the Senate Judiciary Committee vote for Supreme Court nominee Samuel Alito, Sen. Richard Durbin attested that now Justice Alito hailed from "Princeton Law" (Alito attended Princeton University for his undergraduate studies, but received his law degree from Yale Law School). Both de Russy and Durbin became cases in point for Sexton's comments, since the former is an academic holding a Ph.D., while the latter holds a Juris Doctor (J.D.) from Georgetown University Law Center.

Princeton University does award honorary degrees of law. Sonia Sotomayor, then Circuit Judge of the United States Court of Appeals for the Second Circuit and later Associate Justice of the Supreme Court of the United States, received an Honorary Doctor of Laws Degree from Princeton University.

Notable faculty
Joseph Coerten Hornblower

Notes
 Jan Hoffman, "Judge Not, Law Schools Demand Of a Magazine That Ranks Them", New York Times, February 19, 1998.

References

Sources

External links
Is or was there a Princeton Law School? Not really!
Law School Excerpt from A Princeton Companion
"If Princeton Had a Law School" - a poem

Law schools in New Jersey
Princeton University
Defunct private universities and colleges in New Jersey
Buildings and structures in Princeton, New Jersey
Historic district contributing properties in Mercer County, New Jersey
Defunct law schools